Glory, formerly Glory World Series, is an international kickboxing promotion based in Singapore, which is owned by Pierre Andurand, Yao Capital, Scott Rudmann and other investors. It is the largest kickboxing promotion company in the world, and features the highest-level fighters in the sport on its roster.

Glory produces events worldwide that showcase seven weight divisions (six men's divisions and one women's division). As of 2022, Glory has held over 80 events. The first event was held in 2012 in Stockholm, Sweden.

Background
When K-1 began suffering from extreme financial difficulties in 2011, Total Sports Asia, TSA CEO Marcus Luer, Pierre Andurand, and Scott Rudmann of Nectar Capital attempted to buy the brand. K-1 was instead sold to Mike Kim and EMCOM Entertainment Inc. 

In the aftermath, Pierre Andurand, TSA, and the other investors decided to start a brand new kickboxing promotion and acquired United Glory, Golden Glory, and It's Showtime to secure a top event production team and contracts to each promotion's top fighters. Forming the Glory World Series, Pierre Andurand was named Chairman and Scott Rudmann was named vice-chairman. A number of people formerly involved with these three entities event became Glory consultants.

Glory World Series signed most of the world's top kickboxers, such as Peter Aerts, Remy Bonjasky, Semmy Schilt, Gokhan Saki, Daniel Ghiţă, Albert Kraus, and Giorgio Petrosyan.

History
The company includes a mix of entrepreneurs and senior level executives from different environments. The company's current investors include Yao Capital. Former investors have been Liberty Global, and TwinFocus Capital Partners.

In February 2013, Glory announced that former WWE Executive VP Andrew Whitaker had been hired as the global CEO of Glory Sports International. 
In August, 2014 Andrew Whitaker moved into an advisory role within GLORY and Jon J. Franklin was appointed as the new CEO.

In 2018, Glory announced that former CEO Jon J. Franklin had moved to the role of Chief Development Officer, and former UFC executive Marshall Zelaznik had been hired as the new CEO.

On May 15, 2020, Glory announced Zelaznik had resigned as Glory CEO.

On May 26, 2020, Glory Sports International went into receivership, and soon after ownership of Glory was transferred to London-based GSUKCO Limited.

Scott Rudmann is the Executive Vice-Chairman running the league since it was taken over by GSUKCO.

Media coverage 
In June 2013, after having its first U.S. event in New York, Glory 9: New York on June 22, 2013, Spike TV signed a multi-year agreement to broadcast Glory kickboxing events; their partnership began with Glory 11: Chicago on October 12 of that year. The broadcast deal with Spike was extended in May 2014 to cover 2015.

In February 2016, Glory CEO Jon J. Franklin announced a new multi-year deal with ESPN.

Glory was broadcast on Veronica TV in the Netherlands from July, 2018 to February, 2020.

Beginning in 2019, Glory initiated a partnership with the UFC for the former's events to be exclusively carried in the U.S by UFC Fight Pass. The first event to be broadcast as part of this partnership was Glory 63: Houston on February 1 and the last event was Glory 75: Utrecht on February 29, 2020.

Events from Glory 76 to Glory 80 Studio were available through pay-per-view.

28 June 2022 Glory announced a multi-year broadcast deal with Videoland in the Netherlands. The deal covers all Glory events starting from Glory 81: Ben Saddik vs. Adegbuyi 2.
16 August 2022 Glory announced a multi-year broadcast deal with Viaplay in Poland.
5 October 2022 Glory announced a multi-year broadcast deal with TV3 in Estonia, Latvia and Lithuania.

Glory Rivals
In January 2022 Glory announced a new series of events called Glory Rivals, jointly promoted with Enfusion and RISE. The first Rivals event with Enfusion was scheduled for May 21, 2022, at the Lotto Arena in Antwerp, Belgium. The event was later cancelled due to the finances of Enfusion's local promoter partner Antwerp Fight Organization catching the attention of Belgian authorities.

Glory Rivals 1 was instead held on June 11, 2022 in Alkmaar, Netherlands. In the main event Luis Tavares defeated Florent Kaouachi by knockout in the third round.

Glory Rivals 2 was held September 17, 2022 in Alkmaar, Netherlands.

Glory Rivals 3 was organized at Sporthallen Zuid in Amsterdam on November 5, 2022. Ibrahim El Bouni defeated Muhammed Balli by knock-out in the first round.

Glory Rivals 4 took place on December 25th at Ryogoku Sumo Arena in Tokyo, Japan. Kento Haraguchi defeated Serhii Adamchuk by unanimous decision.

GLORY Rivals 5 was organized on January 28, 2023, at Zamna Tulum Hotel in Tulum, Mexico, in collaboration with War of Nations. Abraham Vidales defeated Tomás Aguirre by Unanimous Decision.

Roster

Events

Champions

Current champions

 Indicates former interim champions.
 Indicates current lineal and interim champions.

Glory Heavyweight Championship
Weight limit: Unlimited

Glory Light Heavyweight Championship
Weight limit:

Glory Middleweight Championship
Weight limit:

Glory Welterweight Championship
Weight limit:

Glory Lightweight Championship
Weight limit:

Glory Featherweight Championship
Weight limit:

Glory Women's Super Bantamweight Championship
Weight limit:

Tournament champions

Contender Tournament champions

Qualification Tournament winners

Road to Glory Tournament champions

Multi-division champions
Fighters who have won championships in multiple weight classes (excluding tournament champions).

  Robin van Roosmalen - Won Glory Lightweight Championship on November 7, 2014, then Glory Featherweight Championship on October 21, 2016.
  Alex Pereira - Won Glory Middleweight Championship on October 14, 2017, then Glory Light Heavyweight Championship on January 30, 2021.

Notable fighters

Featherweight

  Serhiy Adamchuk
  Mosab Amrani
  Lim Chi-Bin
  Abdellah Ezbiri
  Massaro Glunder
  Liam Harrison
  Petchpanomrung Kiatmookao
  Yuta Kubo
  Masaaki Noiri
  Fabio Pinca
  Saenchai PKSaenchaimuaythaigym
  Robin van Roosmalen
  Dylan Salvador
  Lee Sung-Hyun
  Tim Thomas
  Kevin VanNostrand
  Gabriel Varga
  Sergio Wielzen

Lightweight

  Chingiz Allazov
  Dzhabar Askerov
  Shemsi Beqiri
  Alessandro Campagna
  Sanny Dahlbeck
  Johann Fauveau
  Marat Grigorian
  Hinata
  Ky Hollenbeck
  Davit Kiria
  Albert Kraus
  Anatoly Moiseev
  Steve Moxon
  Giorgio Petrosyan
  Łukasz Pławecki
  Andy Ristie
  Robin van Roosmalen
  Dylan Salvador
  Simón Santana
  Yoshihiro Sato
  Sitthichai Sitsongpeenong
  Warren Stevelmans
  Jordan Watson
  Bruno Gazani

Welterweight

  Marc de Bonte
  Roberto Cocco
  Raymond Daniels
  Murat Direkçi
  Cedric Doumbe
  Karim Ghajji
  Harut Grigorian
  Murthel Groenhart
  Nieky Holzken
  Paweł Jędrzejczyk
  Karapet Karapetyan
  Yoann Kongolo
  Artur Kyshenko
  Yohan Lidon
  Thiago Michel
  Alim Nabiev
  Antoine Pinto
  Thongchai Sitsongpeenong
  Alexander Stetsurenko
  Chad Sugden
  Alex Tobiasson Harris
  Joseph Valtellini

Middleweight

  Israel Adesanya
  Wayne Barrett
  Yousri Belgaroui
  Chris Camozzi
  Dustin Jacoby
  Artem Levin
  Melvin Manhoef
  Simon Marcus
  L'houcine Ouzgni
  Sahak Parparyan
  Alex Pereira
  Agron Preteni
  Karl Roberson
  Joe Schilling
  Kengo Shimizu
  Bogdan Stoica
  Filip Verlinden
  Steve Wakeling
  Jason Wilnis
  Donovan Wisse
  Amir Zeyada

Light Heavyweight

  Donegi Abena
  Randy Blake
  Mourad Bouzidi
  Saulo Cavalari
  Nathan Corbett
  Abdarhmane Coulibaly
  Michael Duut
  Zinedine Hameur-Lain
  Danyo Ilunga
  Igor Jurković
  Freddy Kemayo
  Steve McKinnon
  Zack Mwekassa
  Nenad Pagonis
  Koichi Pettas
  Gökhan Saki
  Thiago Silva
  Tyrone Spong
  Andrei Stoica
  Stéphane Susperregui
  Luis Tavares
  Makoto Uehara
  Artem Vakhitov
  Pavel Zhuravlev

Heavyweight

  Benjamin Adegbuyi
  Peter Aerts
  Jamal Ben Saddik
  Remy Bonjasky
  Antonio Plazibat 
  Mladen Brestovac
  Brian Douwes
  Ben Edwards
  Mirko Filipović
  Hesdy Gerges
  Daniel Ghiţă
  Badr Hari
  Guto Inocente
  Singh Jaideep
  Jérôme Le Banner
  Ismael Londt
  D'Angelo Marshall
  Cătălin Moroșanu
  Alistair Overeem
  Daniel Sam
  Semmy Schilt
  Antônio Silva
  Anderson Silva
  Giannis Stoforidis
  Ewerton Teixeira
  Rico Verhoeven
  Nicolas Wamba
  Jahfarr Wilnis
  Errol Zimmerman

See also

 Golden Glory

References

External links

 
Kickboxing organizations
Sports organizations established in 2012
2012 establishments in Singapore
Kickboxing in Singapore
Kickboxing in Europe